The Men's individual large hill competition at the FIS Nordic World Ski Championships 2021 was held on 5 March. A qualification was held on 4 March 2021.

Results

Qualification
The qualification was held on 4 March 2021 at 17:30.

Final
The first round was started on 5 March at 17:00 and the final round at 18:10.

References

Men's individual large hill